Moonshine  is high-proof liquor that is usually produced illegally. The name was derived from a tradition of creating the alcohol during the nighttime, thereby avoiding detection. In the first decades of the 21st century, commercial distilleries have begun producing their own novelty versions of moonshine, including many flavored varieties.

Terminology

Different languages and countries have their own terms for moonshine (see Moonshine by country).

In English, moonshine is also known as mountain dew, choop, hooch (abbreviation of hoochinoo, name of a specific liquor, from Tlingit), homebrew, mulekick, shine, white lightning, white/corn liquor, white/corn whiskey, pass around, firewater, bootleg.

Fractional crystallization

The ethanol may be concentrated in fermented beverages by means of freezing. For example, the name applejack derives from the traditional method of producing the drink, jacking, the process of freezing fermented cider and then removing the ice, increasing the alcohol content. Starting with the fermented juice, with an alcohol content of less than ten percent, the concentrated result can contain 25–40% alcohol.

Moonshine stills

In some countries, moonshine stills are illegal to sell, import, and own without permission. However, enthusiasts explain on internet forums how to obtain equipment and assemble it into a still. To cut costs, stainless steel vessels are often replaced with plastic (e.g. polypropylene) vessels that can withstand heat, a concept of the plastic still.

 A column still, or a spiral still, can achieve a vapor alcohol content of 95% ABV.
 Moonshine is usually distilled to 40% ABV, and seldom above 66% based on 48 samples. For example, conventional pot stills commonly produce 40% ABV, and top out between 60 and 80% ABV after multiple distillations. However, ethanol can be dried to 95% ABV by heating 3A molecular sieves such as 3A zeolite.

The preferred heat source for plastic stills or spiral stills are sous vide sticks; these control temperature, time, and circulation, and are therefore preferred over immersion heaters. Multiple units can be used to increase the wattage.

Evaporation stills

Plastic still
A plastic still is a device for distillation specially adapted for separating ethanol and water. Plastic stills are common because they are cheap and easy to manufacture. The principle is that a smaller amount of liquid is placed in an open smaller vessel inside a larger one that is closed. A cheap 100 W immersion heater is typically used as heat source, but a thermal immersion circulator, like a sous vide stick is ideal because it comes with a temperature controller. The condensation that accumulates in the bottom of the vessel can then be diverted directly down through a filter containing activated carbon. The final product has approximately twice as much alcohol content as the starting liquid and can be distilled several times if stronger distillate is desired. The method is slow, and is not suitable for large-scale production.

Boiling stills

Fractional distillation

Column still

A column still, also called a continuous still, patent still or Coffey still, is a variety of still consisting of two columns. A column still can achieve a vapor alcohol content of 95% ABV.

Spiral still
A spiral still is a type of column still with a simple slow air-cooled distillation apparatus, commonly used for bootlegging. Column and cooler consist of a  copper tube wound in spiral form. The tube first goes up to act as a simple column, and then down to cool the product. Cookware usually consists of a  plastic wine bucket. The heat source is typically a thermal immersion circulator (commonly runs at 1200 W), like a sous vide stick because it is hard to find 300 W immersion heaters, and it is risky to disassemble the immersion heater from an electric water boiler because it may cause electrical injury. The spiral burner is popular because despite its simple construction and low manufacturing cost, it can provide 95% ABV.

Pot still

A pot still is a type of distillation apparatus or still used to distill flavored liquors such as whisky or cognac, but not rectified spirit because they are poor at separating congeners. Pot stills operate on a batch distillation basis (as opposed to a Coffey or column stills which operate on a continuous basis). Traditionally constructed from copper, pot stills are made in a range of shapes and sizes depending on quantity and style of spirit. Geographic variations in still design exist, with certain stills gaining popularity in regions of Appalachia.

Spirits distilled in pots is commonly 40% ABV, and top out between 60 and 80% after multiple distillations.

Safety 
Poorly produced moonshine can be contaminated, mainly from materials used in the construction of the still. Stills employing automotive radiators as condensers are particularly dangerous; in some cases, glycol produced from antifreeze can be a problem. Radiators used as condensers could also contain lead at the connections to the plumbing. Using these methods often resulted in blindness or lead poisoning in those who consumed tainted liquor. In Prohibition-era United States, many died from ingesting unhealthy substances with their moonshine. Consumption of lead-tainted moonshine is a serious risk factor for saturnine gout, a very painful but treatable medical condition that damages the kidneys and joints.

Although methanol is not produced in toxic amounts by fermentation of sugars from grain starches, contamination is still possible by unscrupulous distillers using cheap methanol to increase the apparent strength of the product. Moonshine can be made both more palatable and perhaps less dangerous by discarding the "foreshot" – the first  of alcohol that drip from the condenser. Because methanol vaporizes at a lower temperature than ethanol it is commonly believed that the foreshot contains most of the methanol, if any, from the mash. However, research shows this is not the case, and methanol is present until the very end of the distillation run. Despite this, distillers will usually collect the foreshots until the temperature of the still reaches .  Additionally, the head that comes immediately after the foreshot typically contains small amounts of other undesirable compounds, such as acetone and various aldehydes. Fusel alcohols are other undesirable byproducts of fermentation that are contained in the "aftershot", and are also typically discarded.

Alcohol concentrations at higher strengths (the GHS identifies concentrations above 24% ABV as dangerous) are flammable and therefore dangerous to handle. This is especially true during the distilling process when vaporized alcohol may accumulate in the air to dangerous concentrations if adequate ventilation is not provided.

Adulterated moonshine

The incidence of impure moonshine has been documented to significantly increase the risk of renal disease among those who regularly consume it, primarily from increased lead content.

Outbreaks of methanol poisoning have occurred when methanol has been accidentally produced in moonshine production or has been used to adulterate moonshine.

Tests 
A quick estimate of the alcoholic strength, or proof, of the distillate (the ratio of alcohol to water) is often achieved by shaking a clear container of the distillate. Large bubbles with a short duration indicate a higher alcohol content, while smaller bubbles that disappear more slowly indicate lower alcohol content.

A more reliable method is to use an alcoholmeter or hydrometer. A hydrometer is used during and after the fermentation process to determine the potential alcohol percent of the moonshine, whereas an alcoholmeter is used after the product has been distilled to determine the volume percent or proof.

Myth

A common folk test for the quality of moonshine was to pour a small quantity of it into a spoon and set it on fire. The theory was that a safe distillate burns with a blue flame, but a tainted distillate burns with a yellow flame. Practitioners of this simple test also held that if a radiator coil had been used as a condenser, then there would be lead in the distillate, which would give a reddish flame. This led to the mnemonic, "Lead burns red and makes you dead." or "Red means dead."

Legality 
Manufacturing of spirits through distilling, fractional crystallization, etc, outside a registered distillery is illegal in many countries.

History

Moonshine historically referred to "clear, unaged whiskey", once made with barley in Scotland and Ireland or corn mash in the United States, though sugar became just as common in illicit liquor during the last century. The word originated in the British Isles as a result of excise laws, but only became meaningful in the United States after a tax passed during the Civil War outlawing non-registered stills. Illegal distilling accelerated during the Prohibition era (1920–1933) which mandated a total ban on alcohol production under the Eighteenth Amendment of the Constitution. Since the amendment was repealed in 1933, laws focus on evasion of taxation on any type of spirits or intoxicating liquors. Applicable laws were historically enforced by the Bureau of Alcohol, Tobacco, Firearms and Explosives of the US Department of Justice, but are now usually handled by state agencies. Enforcement agents were once known colloquially as "revenuers".

Etymology
The earliest known instance of the term "moonshine" being used to refer to illicit alcohol dates to the 1785 edition of Grose's Dictionary of the Vulgar Tongue, which was published in England. Prior to that, "moonshine" referred to anything "illusory" or to literally the light of the moon. The U.S. Government considers the word a "fanciful term" and does not regulate its use on the labels of commercial products, as such, legal moonshines may be any type of spirit, which must be indicated elsewhere on the label.

Prohibition in the United States

In Prohibition-era United States, moonshine distillation was done at night to avoid discovery. While moonshiners were present in urban and rural areas around the United States after the civil war, moonshine production concentrated in Appalachia because the limited road network made it easy to evade revenue officers and because it was difficult and expensive to transport corn crops. As a study of farmers in Cocke County, Tennessee, observes: "One could transport much more value in corn if it was first converted to whiskey. One horse could haul ten times more value on its back in whiskey than in corn." Moonshiners in Harlan County, Kentucky, like Maggie Bailey, sold moonshine in order to provide for their families. Others, like Amos Owens from Rutherford County, North Carolina and Marvin "Popcorn" Sutton from Maggie Valley, North Carolina, sold moonshine in nearby areas. Sutton's life was covered in a documentary on the Discovery Channel called "Moonshiners". The bootlegger once said that the malt (a combination of corn, barley, rye) is what makes the basic moonshine recipe work. In modern usage, the term "moonshine" is a marketing term used to categorize distilled spirits that are in some sense a continuation of the traditional once-prohibited alcohol, generally having the same or similar method and/or location of production.

Once the liquor was distilled, drivers called "runners" or "bootleggers" smuggled moonshine and "bootleg" (illegally imported) liquor across the region in cars specially modified for speed and load-carrying capacity. The cars were ordinary on the outside but modified with souped-up engines, extra interior room, and heavy-duty shock absorbers to support the weight of the illicit alcohol. After Prohibition ended, the out-of-work drivers kept their skills sharp through organized races, which led to the formation of the National Association for Stock Car Auto Racing (NASCAR). Several former "runners" became noted drivers in the sport.

Some varieties of maize grown in the United States were once prized for their use in moonshine production. One such variety used in moonshine, Jimmy Red corn, almost became extinct when the last grower died in 2000. Described as a "blood-red, flint-hard "dent" corn with a rich and oily germ", two ears of the corn were passed on to "seed saver" Ted Chewning, who saved the variety from extinction and began to produce it on a wider scale.

There have been modern day attempts on the state level to legalize moonshine (home distillation of alcohol), despite there being federal laws prohibiting the practice, similar to how some states have been treating  cannabis. For example, the New Hampshire state legislature has tried multiple times to pass home distilling laws in small batches without requiring licenses to do so.  In 2023, Ohio introduced legislation to do the same with other states likely to follow.

See also 

 Bootleggers and Baptists
 Bureau of Alcohol, Tobacco, Firearms and Explosives (ATF)
 Congener (alcohol)
 Dixie Mafia
 Farmhouse ale
 Free Beer
 Homebrewing
 Moonshine by country
 Moonshine in popular culture
 Nip joint
 Rum-running
 Sour mash

References

Sources
 Davis, Elaine. Minnesota 13: "Wet" Wild Prohibition Days (2007) 
 
 Rowley, Matthew. Moonshine! History, songs, stories, and how-tos (2007) 
 Watman, Max. Chasing the White Dog: An Amateur Outlaw's Adventures in Moonshine (2010) 
 King, Jeff. The Home Distiller's Workbook: Your Guide to Making Moonshine, Whisky, Vodka, Rum and So Much More! (2012)

External links 

 "Moonshine – Blue Ridge Style"  An Exhibition Produced by the Blue Ridge Institute and the Museum of Ferrum College
 Déantús an Phoitín (Poteen Making), by Mac Dara Ó Curraidhín (a one-hour 1998 Irish documentary film on the origins of the craft).
 North Carolina Moonshine – Historical information, images, music, and film excerpts
 Moonshine news page – Alcohol and Drugs History Society
 Georgia Moonshine  – History and folk traditions in Georgia, USA
 "Moonshine 'tempts new generation – BBC on distilling illegal liquor in the 21st century.
 Moonshine Franklin Co Virginia Moonshine Still from the past – Video
 moonshine stills at a-c-e.uk

 
Crimes
Whisky
Distilled drinks
Homebrewing
Illegal drug trade
Alcohol-related crimes